Robert Dennis may refer to:

Robert Dennis (died 1592), alias Denys, of Holcombe Burnell, Devon, England
Robert J. Dennis, American businessman
Robert Dennis (born 1975), Liberian sprinter